Raja Radhika Raman Prasad Sinha (1937–2008) was an Indian civil engineer and a writer of Hindi literature. Born in Patna, in the Indian state of Bihar on May 26, 1937 as the eldest son of Gorakh Prasad and Umraoti Devi couple, Sinha was the pioneer of Hindi fiction and authored several books including The Gandhi Cap and Other Short Stories and Decoding Rig-Veda: For the Knowledge of Science. After his early education at St. Xavier's College, Ranchi, he graduated in electrical engineering from Birsa Institute of Technology Sindri and started his career as a member of faculty at Patna Engineering College. Later he joined the Bihar State Electricity Board where he spent the rest of his career before retiring in 1996 as the general manager of Patna Electric Supply Undertaking (PESU). He was married to Vidya Sinha and the couple had two sons and a daughter. The Government of India awarded him Padma Bhushan, the third highest Indian civilian award, in 1962. The Government of Bihar has instituted an annual award, Raja Radhika Raman  Prasad Singh Prize, in his honor. He died on March 2, 2008, survived by his wife and children.

Bibliography

See also

 Bihari literature
 Acharya Ramlochan Saran

References

Recipients of the Padma Bhushan in literature & education
Hindi-language writers
1937 births
2008 deaths
Writers from Patna
Indian civil engineers